The Garib Janta Dal (Secular) (abbreviated GJD(S)) is a political party in Bihar, India. The party was founded by former Lok Sabha MP Anirudh Prasad Yadav ('Sadhu Yadav') ahead of the 2015 Bihar Legislative Assembly election. Yadav named former Rajya Sabha MP Brahmadeo Anand Paswan as party president.

According to preliminary vote count, GJD(S) gathered 92,279 votes in the 2015 election (0.2% of the statewide vote).

References

External links

Political parties in Bihar
Political parties established in 2015
Janata Parivar
2015 establishments in Bihar